Grassland Farm is a historic gem of the antebellum style of architecture typical of the southern states of that time, in Shelbyville, Tennessee, U.S.. It was built on land donated by the then new state of North Carolina, in the Federal style of the early 1800s (1810-1815), by Alexander Grier, a war hero who had served in the American Revolutionary War. A portico, designed in the Greek Revival architectural style, was added shortly thereafter along with a great room connecting the formerly outside kitchen. It has been listed on the National Register of Historic Places since March 4, 1975.  It is noted for its extraordinary architecture and sprawling 71 acres of gently rolling hills. Several of its mantels are considered some of the very best of their genre.   The original size of the plantation was 5000 acres.  Included on the property are period outbuildings and a breathtaking antique barn. Today, the residence is considered to be among the most beautiful of the area and is privately owned.

When Alexander Grier built the house, it stood on a pasture grant conveyed by North Caroline in 1788, by land grant number 40.  The purchase price was $45 per 100 acres. Concession to modernization was attaching of the two room brick cook-house to the main house. Extreme effort was made to match new to old and to use antique materials whenever possible and available.  The result is that its evident age has been preserved.  Not only is the house on the National Historic Registry, it is also registered with Tennessee's Historical Commission which only did so after extensive inspection.  Although the builder is not known, it is evident that it was the product of a master builder and predated President Andrew Jackson's famed Hermitage.  In over 200 years, no one has damaged the home or altered the excellent Federal style.

Three previous owners fought for the Confederacy: Leroy Barrett, James Newton and Riggs Dixon.  It was also the last home of a Revolutionary war soldier; Grier fought at King's Mountain.  Rutherford county records confirm that Grier came to the site in order to make his "real" home in 1804.  A former resident of Carter County, where he served as Lieutenant Colonel in the militia, in the Territory South of the Ohio River, under Colonel James Robinson of Nashborough fame. Grier came to Beford county when he was 52, and, immediately became active in county affairs.

References

Houses on the National Register of Historic Places in Tennessee
Federal architecture in Tennessee
Greek Revival houses in Tennessee
Houses completed in 1810
Buildings and structures in Shelbyville, Tennessee
National Register of Historic Places in Bedford County, Tennessee